Aechmea vallerandii is a species of flowering plant in the genus Aechmea. This was for a time called A. beeriana but was reclassified in 2008. It is native to Panama and to northern South America (Colombia, Venezuela, Suriname, French Guiana, Colombia, Peru, northern Brazil).

Cultivars
 Aechmea 'Salvador'
 Aechmea 'Tropic Torch'

References

BSI Cultivar Registry Retrieved 11 October 2009

vallerandii
Flora of South America
Flora of Panama
Plants described in 1877
Taxa named by Élie-Abel Carrière